Vitaliy Antonovych Satskyi was a Ukrainian politician, director of Zaporizhstal, former metallurgist. He was a member of the Academy of Mining Sciences of Ukraine (1993), the Academy of Engineering Sciences of Ukraine, and the Russian Academy of Natural Sciences.

Career
Born in village of Chubarivka (today Polohy), in 1954 Satskyi graduated a technological faculty of the Dnipropetrovsk Metallurgical Institute (today the National Metallurgical Academy of Ukraine) as engineer-metallurgist.

In 1954 to 1980 he worked at the leading metal producing factory in Ukraine Kryvorizhstal starting from engineer-roller of rolling shop and secretary of the factory's Komsomol Committee to chief engineer and deputy director of Kryvorizhstal in 1968.

In 1980-1983 Satskyi was a director of the All-Union Research and Development Design Institute of Mechanized Labor in Ferrous Metallurgy in Dnipropetrovsk or briefly Mekhchormet and in 1983-1986 he was a chief of the Ukrmetalurhprom (Ukrainian Metallurgy).

In 1986-2012 Satskyi was a director of Zaporizhstal and in 1990-1994 a People's Deputy of Ukraine. In 18 March 1990 he was elected at the Zavodskyi electoral district (#180) of Zaporizhia city among eight runners. In 1950-1991 Satskyi was a member of the Communist Party of the Soviet Union.

On 26 October 2017 he died after a after prolonged illness. At time of death, Satskyi was on the Forbes list of the most rich people in Ukraine with his assets estimated at $128 million.

Awards
 Laureate of the State Prize of UkrSSR in Science and Technology (1970)
 Merited Metallurgist of Ukraine (1975)
 Hero of Ukraine (1999)
 Laureate of the State Prize of Ukraine in Science and Technology (2001)

 Order of the Badge of Honour (1966)
 Order of the Red Banner of Labour (1971)
 Full cavalier of the Order of Merit (all three degrees 1993–2005)
 Order of State (1999)
 Order of Prince Yaroslav the Wise (5th degree, 2009)

References

External links
 Buzalo, V. Vitaliy Satskyi. Encyclopedia of History of Ukraine.
 Shykhanov, R. Vitaliy Satskyi. Famous Zaporizhians (Slavetni Zaporizhtsi).
 Vitaliy Satskyi at Forbes-Ukraine
 Vitaliy Satskyi. National Metallurgical Academy of Ukraine. "Lohos-Ukrayina Publishing". Kyiv, 2015
 Profile at Verkhovna Rada website

1930 births
2017 deaths
People from Polohy
People from Zaporizhia Okruha
First convocation members of the Verkhovna Rada
Zaporizhstal
Ukrainian metallurgists
Recipients of the title of Hero of Ukraine
Recipients of the Order of State
Recipients of the Order of Prince Yaroslav the Wise, 5th class
Recipients of the Order of Merit (Ukraine), 1st class
Recipients of the Order of Merit (Ukraine), 2nd class
Recipients of the Order of Merit (Ukraine), 3rd class
Laureates of the State Prize of Ukraine in Science and Technology